Sunlight is the total spectrum of the electromagnetic radiation given off by the Sun.

Sunlight may also refer to:

Places
 Sunlight, Missouri, US, an unincorporated community
 Sunlight, West Virginia, US, an unincorporated community
 Sunlight Peak, a mountain in Colorado
 Sunlight Peak (Wyoming), a mountain
 Sunlight Ski Area, a ski area near Glenwood Springs, Colorado

Arts and entertainment
 Sunlight (Benson), a 1909 painting by Frank Weston Benson
 John Sunlight, a fictional nemesis of Doc Savage
Sunlight, a 1913 short film starring Francis X. Bushman

Music
 Sunlight Studio, a recording studio in Stockholm, Sweden

Albums
 Sunlight (Herbie Hancock album) or the title song, 1978
 Sunlight (Nicky Byrne album) or the title song (see below), 2016
 Sunlight (Spacey Jane album), 2020
 Sunlight, by the Youngbloods, 1971

Songs
 "Sunlight" (DJ Antoine song), 2011
 "Sunlight" (DJ Sammy song), 2002
 "Sunlight" (The Magician song), 2014
 "Sunlight" (Modestep song), 2011
 "Sunlight" (Nicky Byrne song), 2016
 "Sunlight", by Bag Raiders from Bag Raiders, 2010
 "Sunlight", by Deas Vail from Birds and Cages, 2010
 "Sunlight", by Diana Vickers, a B-side of the single "Once", 2010
 "Sunlight", by Hozier from Wasteland, Baby!, 2019
 "Sunlight", by Oh Land from Family Tree, 2019
 "Sunlight", by TheFatRat and Phaera, 2019
 "Sunlight", by Tune-Yards from Bird-Brains, 2009
 "Sunlight", written by Jesse Colin Young, released by the Youngbloods on Elephant Mountain, 1969, and covered by Three Dog Night on Naturally, 1970
"The Sunlight" by Janis Ian from Present Company, 1971

Sports
 Sunlight (horse) (foaled 2015), an Australian Thoroughbred racehorse
 Sunlight Park, a one-time baseball park in Toronto, Ontario, Canada

Transport
 SS Sunlight, originally SS Empire Balfour, a refrigerated cargo ship for the Pan-Norse Steamship Company 1962-1967
 Sunair Sunlight, a German ultralight electric trike aircraft

Other uses
 Sunlight (cleaning product), a brand of laundry soap
 Sunlight Foundation, a foundation for promoting online government transparency
 Sunlight House, an art deco office building in Manchester, England
 Sunlight Solar Energy, an American solar power company headquartered in Bend, Oregon
 Joseph Sunlight (1889–1978), Russian-English architect

See also
Daylight (disambiguation)
Sun (disambiguation)
Sun Ray (disambiguation)
Sunshine (disambiguation)